is a 1955 color (Eastmancolor) Japanese drama film directed by Koji Shima. It was entered into the 1956 Cannes Film Festival.

Cast
 Bontarō Miyake as Yasuke Shiraishi
 Ayako Wakao as Yuki Shiraishi
 Yukihiro Iwatare as Jiro Shiraishi
 Yoshiro Kitahara as Toki Onoshi
 Koreya Senda as Hamamura
 Eijirō Yanagi as Hyogoro Onishi
 Akihiko Yusa as Ichiro Shiraishi

References

External links

1955 films
Japanese drama films
1950s Japanese-language films
1955 drama films
Films directed by Koji Shima
Films produced by Masaichi Nagata
1950s Japanese films